Abbas İsrafil oğlu Hüseynov (born on 13 June 1995) is an Azerbaijani footballer who plays as a defender for Qarabağ FK and the Azerbaijan national team.

Career

International
On 30 January 2018, Hüseynov made his senior international debut for Azerbaijan friendly game against Moldova.

Career statistics

International

Statistics accurate as of match played 7 September 2021

Honours
Qarabağ
Azerbaijan Premier League: (3) 2017–18, 2018–19, 2019–20

References

External links
 
 

1995 births
Living people
Association football defenders
Azerbaijani footballers
Shamakhi FK players
Qarabağ FK players
Azerbaijan Premier League players
Azerbaijan international footballers
Azerbaijan under-21 international footballers
Azerbaijan youth international footballers